Tanaeang is a settlement in Kiribati.  It is located on Tabiteuea atoll; to its west is Nuribenua, while Eita and Terikiai lie to the east.

Bishop Octave Terrienne built in 1936 the Main Cathedral of his vicariate.

Populated places in Kiribati
Tabiteuea